San Julian Bay is a curved bay, located next to the city of San Julián in Santa Cruz Province, Argentina.

Magellan spent a few months here during his voyage.

Bays of Argentina